John Zarno (born 27 September 1950) is a British fencer. He competed in the individual and team sabre events at the 1984 Summer Olympics.

References

External links
 

1950 births
Living people
British male fencers
Olympic fencers of Great Britain
Fencers at the 1984 Summer Olympics
Sportspeople from New York (state)